Dries Van Langenhove (born 11 May 1993) is a Belgian politician. Since 2017, he is the founder and leader of the right-wing, Flemish nationalist youth organization , which has been described as far-right. In 2019, he was elected to the Chamber of Representatives on the Vlaams Belang ticket despite not being a registered member of the party.

Early life
Van Langenhove was born in Dendermonde and grew up in Opwijk. He initially started studying political science at Ghent University. Meanwhile, he trained as a plumber. After obtaining his bachelor degree, he began studying law at the same university.

Politics
Van Langenhove was active in the Conservative and Flemish nationalist student fraternity Katholiek Vlaams Hoogstudentenverbond. When a lecture by State Secretary Theo Francken at the Vrije Universiteit Brussel was cancelled in 2017 after left-wing protesters disrupted the event, Van Langenhove mobilized supporters from an internet group to organize further Theo Francken events. Until August 2017 he wrote about migration and integration for the conservative website SCEPTR .

Along with Vlaams Belang Jongeren and the NSV he helped to organise a demonstration in Brussels against the UN Global Compact on Migration. In 2018, he also led a counter-demonstration alongside YouTube commentator Lauren Southern. Van Langenhove and Schild en Vrienden members disrupted pro-immigration activists at Gravensteen castle calling for more humane refugee policies. The counter-demonstration was filmed and posted on Facebook.

In 2019, Van Langenhove announced he was to stand as an independent MP for the Chamber of Representatives in the 2019 Federal election, and it was later confirmed by Tom Van Grieken that he would run for the Vlaams Belang party (despite not being a full member) and head the VB's list in the Flemish Brabant region. He was elected to the Chamber with 39,295 preference votes.

Controversy
In 2017, Van Langenhove set up a youth movement called  which shared right-wing memes and participated in political demonstrations. An investigation by Belgian TV show Pano and journalist  found that members of the group were sharing racist, antisemitic and sexist content and memes on secret Facebook and Discord groups. In these groups, Verheyden also encountered posts promoting violence as well as references to Nazi Germany. The group was also investigated under potential breaches of the 1981 anti-racism law. As a result of the investigation Van Langenhove, who denied involvement in sharing content in any of the groups, was temporarily suspended as a student by the university of Ghent.

On January 21, 2021, the public prosecutor's office asked parliament to lift the parliamentary immunity of Van Langenhove due to an investigation into breaching of the anti-racism law, the Belgian Holocaust denial law and weapon law. Van Langenhoven and eight other core members of Schild en Vrienden are to appear in the Ghent court on April 25, 2022.

Notes

References

External links

1993 births
Living people
Vlaams Belang politicians
Members of the Belgian Federal Parliament
21st-century Belgian politicians
Flemish politicians
Political controversies in Belgium